AKM Abu Taher (c. 1932 – 23 September 2004) was an industrialist and politician in Bangladesh. Taher was a founding member, Sponsor Director, and Chairman of the first private bank in Bangladesh fully owned by Bangladeshi entrepreneurs, National Bank Ltd, as well as a founding director of Al Arafah bank Ltd. He was also a chairman and managing director of Beco group of Industries, Purbachal Drillers Ltd, and Founder Director of Pragati Insurance Ltd and Pragati Life Insurance Ltd.  He was also a social worker and philanthropist. He served in the Jatiya Sangsad, the national parliament of Bangladesh, as a Bangladesh Nationalist Party member for Comilla-7 (Barura).

References 

Bangladeshi businesspeople
2004 deaths
Year of birth uncertain
5th Jatiya Sangsad members
6th Jatiya Sangsad members
8th Jatiya Sangsad members